Ballinger is a Germanic and English surname with Norman influences. Variants include Bellinger, Balinger, Barringer, Bellanger, Behringer, Berninger, Bailinger. Notable people with the surname include:

Colleen Ballinger, American comedian, actress, singer and YouTube personality
Bill Ballinger (born 1945), Canadian politician
Bill S. Ballinger (1912–1980) American author and screenwriter
Heather Ballinger (born 1982), Australian rugby league player
Ian Ballinger (born 1925), New Zealand sports shooter and Olympic bronze medalist
Margaret Ballinger (1894–1980) was the first President of the Liberal Party of South Africa
Mark Ballinger (born 1949), former Major League Baseball pitcher
Paul Ballinger (born 1953), New Zealand long-distance runner
Richard A. Ballinger (1858–1922), Mayor of Seattle, Washington, and U.S. Secretary of the Interior
William Pitt Ballinger (1825–1888), Texas lawyer and statesman
Bob Ballinger (born 1974), Arkansas senator

See also
 Art Balinger (1915–2011), American actor

References